Mandala Myint (also spelt Mandalar Myint) was a prominent Burmese classical singer, best known for her rendition of "Shwebo Thanakha" (ရွှေဘိုသနပ်ခါး), composed by Nandawshe Saya Tin. She was born Ma Ngwe on 16 March 1910 to parents U Hmyin and Daw Hsin, the third of five children, in Mandalay, British Burma. She became blind at a young age. Throughout her career, she was ascribed to over 21 songs. 

She never married, and lived with her nephews and nieces. She died on 3 May 1990 in Mandalay.

References

20th-century Burmese women singers
1910 births
1990 deaths
People from Mandalay